Charles "Charlie" Staines (birth unknown – death unknown) was a Welsh professional rugby league footballer who played in the 1930s, 1940s and 1950s.

Playing career

International honours
Charlie Staines won a cap for Wales while at Castleford on 22 September 1948 in the 5-11 defeat by England at Central Park, Wigan.

County League appearances
Charlie Staines played in Castleford's victory in the Yorkshire County League during the 1938–39 season.

References

External links
Charles Staines Memory Box Search at archive.castigersheritage.com
Charlie Staines Memory Box Search at archive.castigersheritage.com
Search for "Charles Staines" at britishnewspaperarchive.co.uk
Search for "Charlie Staines" at britishnewspaperarchive.co.uk

Castleford Tigers players
Place of birth missing
Place of death missing
Rugby league second-rows
Wales national rugby league team players
Welsh rugby league players
Year of birth missing
Year of death missing